André-Bouron Hospital (French: Hôpital André-Bouron) was a hospital in Saint-Laurent-du-Maroni, French Guiana. The hospital was constructed in 1882 for both the civilian population and the prisoners of Saint-Laurent-du-Maroni. On 9 March 1999, it was declared a historical monument. The hospital closed on 27 September 2018

History
On 21 February 1858, the first prisoners arrived in Saint-Laurent-du-Maroni. In the 1870s, a clinic was built. In 1882, a hospital was built at the site for both the civilian population and the prisoners. The hospital was reconstructed in 1899 with a pavilion system. Two pavilions were for the free citizens and eight for the prisoners. In 1912, the hospital was extended to 400 beds, and was the largest hospital in the French colonies. In 1972, the hospital was modernized and named after Charles-Louis André Bouron, the former chief surgeon. The capacity was reduced to 274 beds, and three services were offered: general medicine, surgery and gynaecology. The terrain also contained a hospice with 175 beds.

On 9 March 1999, the hospital was declared a historical monument. In August 2000, Centre Hospitalier de l’Ouest Guyanais was opened to replace the hospital. Initially, the new hospital had a capacity of 183 beds, however it was being extended for 325 beds. André-Bouron Hospital closed on 27 September 2018.

References

Bibliography
 

Defunct hospitals in France
Buildings and structures in Saint-Laurent-du-Maroni
Hospitals established in 1882
Hospitals disestablished in 2018
Hospitals in French Guiana